The whiplash or whiplash line is a motif of decorative art and design that was particularly popular in Art Nouveau.  It is an asymmetrical, sinuous line, often in an ornamental S curve, usually inspired by natural forms such as plants and flowers, which suggests dynamism and movement. It took its name from a woven fabric panel called "Coup de Fouet" ("Whiplash") by the German artist Hermann Obrist (1895) which depicted  the stems and roots of the cyclamen flower. The panel was later reproduced by the textile workshop of the Darmstadt Artists Colony.

Curling whiplash lines were modelled after natural and vegetal forms, particularly the cyclamen, iris, orchid, thistle, mistletoe, holly, water lily and from the stylized lines of the swan, peacock, dragonfly and butterfly.

In architecture, furniture and other decorative arts, the decoration was entirely integrated with the structure. The whiplash lines were frequently interlaced and combined with twists and scrolls to inspire a poetic and romantic association. Femininity and romanticism were represented by the lines of long curling hair intertwined with flowers.

Designers such as Henry van de Velde used the whiplash line to create a sense of tension and dynamism. He wrote: "A line is a force like other elementary forces. Several lines put together but opposed act like the presence of multiple forces.

Noted designers who used the whiplash line included Aubrey Beardsley, Hector Guimard, Alphonse Mucha and Victor Horta.  In the Art Nouveau period, the whiplash line appeared frequently in furniture design, railings and other ornamental iron work, floor tiles, posters and jewelry. It became so common that critics of Art Nouveau ridiculed it as "the noodle style".

Origins
The twisting and curving lines of the whiplash form have a long history. They are similar to the arabesque design, used particularly in Islamic art, such as the ceramic tiles of the mosque of Samarkand in Central Asia, They featured prominently in the lavish decoration of the rocaille or rococo style in the early 18th century. They were found in the Japanese prints of Katsushika Hokusai, which became popular in France just as the Art Nouveau movement was beginning, and which particularly inspired the paintings of flowers by Vincent van Gogh, such as The Irises (1890).

Architecture
The Belgian architect Victor Horta was among the first to introduce the whiplash curve into Art Nouveau architecture, particularly in the wrought iron stairways and complementary ceramic floors and painted walls of the Hôtel Tassel in Brussels (1892–93). The lines were was inspired by the curving stems of plants and flowers. The French architect Hector Guimard also adapted the curving lines, particularly in the gateway, stairway and interior decoration of the Castel Béranger in Paris (1894–98), and in the edicules over the entrances of the Paris Métro that he designed for the Paris Universal Exposition of 1900. Guimard also used the curving whiplash line on a large scale on the facade of the house he built for he ceramics manufacturer Coilliot in Lille (1898–1900).

Another major figure using the whiplash form was the furniture designer Louis Majorelle, who incorporated the twisting whiplash line not only into his furniture, but also into cast iron staircase railings, stained glass windows.

The whiplash line in ceramics was also sometimes used for exterior decoration, for example under the peristyle in the courtyard of the Petit Palais in Paris, built for the 1900 Paris Universal Exposition. It also appears in the curving cast iron staircase and ceramic floors of the interior of the Petit Palais. The architect Jules Lavirotte covered the facade of several of houses in Paris, particularly the Lavirotte Building on Avenue Rapp, with curling ceramic whiplash designs made by the ceramics firm of Alexandre Bigot.

Wrought iron and cast iron
The use of wrought iron or cast iron in scrolling whiplash forms on doorways, balconies and gratings became one of the prominent features of the Art Nouveau style. The architect Victor Horta, who had worked on the construction of iron and glass Royal Greenhouses of Laeken in Belgium, was one of the first to create Art Nouveau ironwork, followed quickly by Hector Guimard, whose iron edibles for the entrances of the Paris Métro became an emblem of the style.

Graphic arts and painting
The whiplash line was especially popular in posters and the graphic arts. In the posters of Alphonse Mucha and Koloman Moser, it was frequently used to depict women's hair, which became a central motif of the posters. After 1900 the whiplash lines tended to be more styled and abstract.

The line also appeared in decorative paintings, such as the series of wall paintings made by Margaret Macdonald Mackintosh of the Glasgow School. Her paintings, particularly the White Rose and Red Rose decorative panels (1903), were exhibited at gallery Vienna Secession, where they may have influenced the decorative paintings of Gustav Klimt at the Stoclet Palace made the following year.

Furniture and ornament
Art Nouveau was a comprehensive form of decoration, in which all the elements; furniture, lamps, ironwork, carpets, murals, and glassware, had to be in the same style, or the harmony was broken. Victor Horta, Hector Guimard, Henry van de Velde and other Art Nouveau architects designed chairs, tables, lamps, carpets, tapestries ceramics and other furnishings with similar curling whiplash lines. The whiplash line was intended to show the clear break from the eclectic historical styles that had dominated furniture and decoration for most of the 19th century. Henry Van de Velde and Horta in particular integrated the whiplash lines into their furniture, both in the shapes of desks and tables, the legs, in the brassware handles, and in railings and lamps, as well as in the chairs. Right angles were nearly banished from the works. 

An important furniture workshop was created in the French city of Nancy by Louis Majorelle. Many designs with the whiplash line inspired by water lilies and other natural forms were created by Majorelle's designers. In Belgium the most notable designer using the motif was Gustave Serrurier-Bovy  After 1900, the whiplash lines became simpler and more stylized. In the Glasgow School in Scotland, the motif was used in furniture by Charles Rennie Mackintosh and in highly-stylized glass and paintings by his wife, Margaret Macdonald Mackintosh.

Ceramics and glass

Glass art was a medium in which Art Nouveau found new and varied ways of expression. Intense amount of experimentation went on to find new effects of transparency and opacity: in engraving with cameo, double layers, and acid engraving, a technique which permitted production in series. In ceramics and glass, the whiplash lines were mostly taken from floral and animal forms. After 1900, they kept the floral motifs but became simpler and more stylized.

Jewelry
European jewelers were very quick to adapt the whiplash line to pendants and other ornaments. The Belgian designer Philippe Wolfers was one of the pioneers of the style. His drawings show how he carefully analysed the forms of flowers and plants and used them in his jewelry. His work often crossed the frontiers between sculpture and decorative art, inspired by the lines of forms ranging from dragonflies to bats to Grecian masks. He made not only jewelry, but also bronzes, lamps, vases, glassware and other decorative objects, produced mostly for the Belgian glass factory of Val Saint Lambert.

In Paris, the most prominent jewelry designers were René Lalique and Fouquet. Their designers made abundant use of the whiplash line to suggest natural forms, from waterfalls to iris flowers. Other artists, including Alphonse Mucha, contributed jewelry designs incorporating the whiplash line.

Notes and citations

Bibliography

 
 
 
 

Visual motifs